Flash Airlines was a private charter airline operating out of Cairo, Egypt that was part of the Flash Group tourism company.  The airline operated two Boeing 737-3Q8 aircraft manufactured in 1993 on non-scheduled commercial passenger flights on both international and domestic routes.

History

The airline was established in 1995 as Heliopolis Airlines. It received its certificate of operation from the Egyptian authorities in 1996. It became a member of the Flash group in 2000. During that year Flash Airlines had one 737-300 with another that joined in 2002.

In 2002, Swiss aviation authorities performed a surprise inspection on SU-ZCF, a Flash Airlines Boeing 737-300. They discovered missing pilot oxygen masks, a lack of oxygen tanks, and inoperable cockpit instruments. The Swiss grounded the aircraft until Flash repaired the plane. Several days later, Switzerland banned Flash. Poland also banned Flash, while tour operators in Norway ceased contracting. In early 2004, SU-ZCF crashed while operating Flash's Flight 604 from Sharm el-Sheikh to Paris via Cairo. The subsequent investigation exposed poor safety measures and pilot disorientation, which led to the demise of Flash.

Fleet

Flash Airlines
The Flash Airlines fleet consisted of the following aircraft during operations:

Heliopolis Airlines
The Heliopolis Airlines fleet consisted of the following aircraft before merging into Flash group:

Accidents and incidents
 On 3 January 2004, Flash Airlines Flight 604, operated by a Boeing 737-300 registration SU-ZCF, crashed into the Red Sea shortly after taking off from Sharm el-Sheikh. All passengers and crew died. As a result of the crash, Flash Airlines went out of business in March 2004.

References

External links

 Flash Group official website (now known as Flash International)

Defunct airlines of Egypt
Airlines established in 1995
Airlines disestablished in 2004
2004 disestablishments in Egypt
Defunct charter airlines
Egyptian companies established in 1995